Mallophyton is a genus of flowering plants belonging to the family Melastomataceae.

Its native range is Venezuela.

Species
Species:
 Mallophyton chimantense Wurdack

References

Melastomataceae
Melastomataceae genera